Alexander is a lunar impact crater-like feature in the rugged surface to the north of Mare Serenitatis. It lies to the south-southwest of the prominent crater Eudoxus, and to the east-northeast of Calippus. It was named after Alexander the Great. 

The Alexander formation has been so heavily worn and distorted with the passage of time that it now resembles little more than a lowland region enclosed by rugged ranges. The rim segments lie along the northwest, west, and south sections of the crater, while the eastern side stands open to the surrounding surface. The surviving walls are nearly rectangular in form, with the most prominent mounts in the northwest.

The crater floor is more smooth and has a darker albedo in the western half, and gradually grows lighter and more impacted toward the east. There are no craters of significance within the perimeter of this formation, although there are tiny craterlets aplenty in the rougher eastern section.

Satellite craters
By convention these features are identified on lunar maps by placing the letter on the side of the crater midpoint that is closest to Alexander.

References

 
 
 
 
 
 
 
 
 
 
 

Impact craters on the Moon